Daniel Górak (born 9 October 1983) is a Polish table tennis player. He competed at the 2016 Summer Olympics as part of the Polish team in the men's team event and is currently playing for PKS Jarosław Kolping.

References

1983 births
Living people
Polish male table tennis players
Olympic table tennis players of Poland
Table tennis players at the 2016 Summer Olympics
Sportspeople from Kraków
Table tennis players at the 2015 European Games
European Games competitors for Poland